Yangshi Town is an urban town in and subdivision of Lianyuan, Hunan Province, People's Republic of China.

Administrative division
The town is divided into 55 villages and 7 communities, the following areas: 
 
  Saili Community
  Quanxi Community
  Yongfutuan Community
  Xianghuolu Community
  Lixin Community
  Sunshuihe Community
  Jixiang Community
  Yonghe Village
  Meishan'ao Village
  Tuanshan Village
  Xinjian Village
  Huishui Village
  Meilin Village
  Qijia Village
  Renrang Village
  Jinpen Village
  Huping Village
  Wutong Village
  Yongjia Village
  Wuyi Village
  Shanlong Village
  Longdang Village
  Manjia Village
  Jinxing Village
  Shijia Village
  Shansong Village
  Xianbu Village
  Shuangjiangkou Village
  Pijia Village
  Tongzishan Village
  Huazhong Village
  Xiangsi Village
  Longfu Village
  Taihe Village
  Guanzhuang Village
  Banqiao Village
  Doushan Village
  Longtan Village
  Nanchong Village
  Quanhe Village
  Mixi Village
  Chetianlong Village
  Changxiping Village
  Kuaixi Village
  Qianji Village
  Rongfeng Village
  Zhuangwan Village
  Meishui Village
  Baishui Village
  Lianmeng Village
  Da'ao Village
  Shanshu Village
  Longxi Village
  Gaoting Village
  Gaoshan Village
  Laoqiao Village
  Chating Village
  Chaofu Village
  Diji Village
  Dongyuan Village
  Dongping Village
  Xiaojiang Village 

Divisions of Lianyuan
Towns of Hunan